Aai Thor Tujhe Upkaar is a Marathi movie, which was released in November 1999. The movie is produced by Uma Prakash Bhende and directed by her husband Prakash Bhende.

Soundtrack
The music has been provided by Nandu Honap and the sound tracks are listed below.

Track listing

References

External links 
  Laxmikant Berde's marathi movie's list

1999 films
1990s Marathi-language films